The National Federation of General Workers' Unions (Ippan Domei) was a general union representing workers in Japan.

The union was established in 1966, and affiliated to the Japanese Confederation of Labour.  By 1967, it had 84,617 members.  It was a later a founding affiliate of the Japanese Trade Union Confederation.  In 1995, it merged with the Japanese Federation of Chemical and General Workers' Unions to form the Japanese Federation of Chemical, Service and General Trade Unions.

References

General unions
Trade unions established in 1966
Trade unions disestablished in 1995
Trade unions in Japan